The 2021 season is Molde's 14th consecutive year in Eliteserien, and their 45th season in the top flight of Norwegian football. They will also compete in the Norwegian Cup and Europa League and the Europa Conference League.

Season events
On 18 January, Henry Wingo was sold to Ferencváros for an undisclosed fee.

On 1 February, Molde announced the return of Björn Sigurðarson on a two-year contract from Lillestrøm.

On 2 February, Molde announced the signing of Datro Fofana to a four-year contract from AFAD.

On 8 February, Molde's home leg of their UEFA Europa League Round of 32 tie with 1899 Hoffenheim, was moved from their Aker Stadion in Molde to the Estadio de la Cerámica in Villarreal, due to restrictions imposed by Norway on travelers from Germany out of concern of the COVID-19 variant B.1.1.7.

On 15 February, Álex Craninx joined Lillestrøm on loan for the season.

On 4 March, Tobias Christensen was sold to Vålerenga.

On 16 March, Jakob Ørsahl was sold to Raufoss.

On 31 March, the 2021 Eliteserien season, that was due to start on 5 April, was postponed by the till 8 May due to the COVID-19 pandemic in Norway.

On 12 April, Tobias Hestad joined Raufoss on loan for the season.

On 16 April, goalkeeper Oliver Petersen signed a new contract with Molde until the end of the 2024 season.

On 6 May, Molde announced the signing of Magnus Grødem to a three-year contract from Sandnes Ulf.

On 22 June, Molde confirmed that they had sold Marcus Pedersen to Feyenoord, with the transfer being finalised on 1 July.

On 27 July, Adrian Ugelvik joined Brattvåg.

On 28 July, Molde announced the signing of Sivert Mannsverk on a contract until 2025, from Sogndal.

On 31 July, Lillestrøm announced that they had ended Álex Craninx's loan early and that he would return to Molde.

On 8 August, Molde announced that Fredrik Aursnes had been sold to Feyenoord, joining Marcus Pedersen who'd made the same move a few weeks prior, for an undisclosed fee.

On 16 August, Molde announced the signing of Rafik Zekhnini from Fiorentina. The following dat, 17 August, Molde announced the return of Martin Linnes to the club after his Galatasaray contract had expired.

On 19 August, Mathis Bolly joined Stabæk on loan for the remainder of the season.

On 27 August, Mathias Ranmark joined Moss on loan for the remainder of the season.

On 31 August, Stian Gregersen left Molde to sign for Girondins de Bordeaux.

On 9 September, Oliver Petersen joined Grorud on loan for the remainder of the season. The following day, 10 September, Molde announced the signing of Niklas Haugland, who'd been without a club since leaving Leeds United during the summer of 2021, on a contract until the end of 2022.

Squad

Transfers

In

Out

 Pedersen's move was announced on the above date, but was not finalised until 1 July 2021.

Loans out

Released

Friendlies

Competitions

Europa League

Knockout phase

Eliteserien

Results summary

Results by match

Results

Table

Norwegian Cup

Fourth round took place during the 2022 season.

Europa Conference League

Qualifying rounds

Squad statistics

Appearances and goals

|-
|colspan="14"|Players away from Molde on loan:

|-
|colspan="14"|Players who appeared for Molde no longer at the club:

|}

Goal scorers

Clean sheets

Disciplinary record

See also
Molde FK seasons

References

2021
Molde
Molde